Ophélie Kleerekoper-Winter (born 20 February 1974) is a French pop and R&B singer, songwriter, model and actress. The daughter of Dutch singer, David Alexandre Winter and French fashion model, Catherine Fefeu. She rose to prominence in much of Europe after signing with EastWest Records in 1995 and released her hit song "Dieu m'a donné la foi" which reached number one on the French singles chart as well as other hits: "le feu qui m'attise", "Shame on U", "Elle Pleure"" and "Sache"".

Early life 
Winter was born in Boulogne-Billancourt, Hauts-de-Seine. Her father David Alexandre Winter was a Dutch pop singer who had some success during the 1970s, while her mother Catherine Fefeu was a French fashion model, who is now her agent. Her brother Michael is a singer and TV-presenter.

Her parents divorced when she was just 2 years old and she moved to Paris with her mother and brother, while her father left for the United States. In 1984, at the age of 10, she recorded her first song in France, La Chanson des Klaxons and 3 years later another song, Poil de Carotte, in French. At the age of 17, she was discovered by a modeling agent on the Champs-Élysées in Paris and after three years of modeling, she decided to become a singer and an actress.

Career
Ophélie Winter has released four studio albums starting in 1996, with her debut album, No Soucy !, which her brother collaborated on, Privacy, Explicit Lyrics and Résurrection. The singer Prince wrote her a song. It was announced at one point that Prince intended The Most Beautiful Girl In The World, to be recorded in multiple languages by local artists, but it is unknown how many of these recordings took place; one recording that was made was Le Garçon Le Plus Beau Dans L’Univers by French model and actress Ophélie Winter (intended for a single, Le Garçon Le Plus Beau Dans L’Univers), but this remains unreleased. Ophélie Winter was a featured model in a photoshoot with Prince/0)+> in 1995, holding his gold symbol guitar.

In late 2014 she became a contestant on the fifth season of TF1's Danse avec les Stars.

She currently resides in Paris making various TV appearances. Her look-alike puppet is in the French show "Les Guignols de l'info" (1988).

Discography 

 No Soucy !(1996)
 Privacy  (1998)
 Explicit Lyrics (2002)

Selected filmography

References

External links 

1974 births
Living people
People from Boulogne-Billancourt
French film actresses
French television actresses
French people of Dutch descent
Participants in French reality television series
20th-century French actresses
21st-century French actresses
French contemporary R&B singers
French women pop singers
Warner Music France artists
21st-century French singers
21st-century French women singers
French female models